Dave Smith is a former running back in the National Football League.

Biography
Smith was born on December 9, 1947 in Salt Lake City, Utah.

Career
Smith was drafted by the Green Bay Packers in the thirteenth round of the 1970 NFL Draft and played that season with the team. He played at the collegiate level at the University of Utah.

See also
List of Green Bay Packers players

References

1947 births
Living people
Players of American football from Salt Lake City
Green Bay Packers players
American football running backs
University of Utah alumni
Utah Utes football players